Lisa Schiff (born December 2, 1969 in Miami) is an American art advisor and specialist in contemporary and modern art, based in New York. She is the founder and president of SFA Advisory (Schiff Fine Art) with offices in New York, Los Angeles and London. Her clients include individuals, corporations, foundations and institutions. Amongst her roster of clients is the actor Leonardo DiCaprio and his Leonardo DiCaprio Foundation (LDF).

Education 
Born in Miami, Florida, in 1969, Schiff was educated in Ann Arbor, Michigan, where she completed a Bachelor of Arts degree (art history and French) at the University of Michigan. She attended Columbia University's Reid Hall in Paris, finishing her undergraduate thesis while in residence there. She continued attending law school at the Faculte de Droit de Montpellier, France. When Schiff returned to the states, she completed a Master of Arts (art history) at the University of Miami, Florida. Later, Schiff attended the Graduate Center at the City University of New York, where she has advanced to doctoral candidate (ABD), in art history.

Career 
Schiff held her first gallery position in Paris in 1991. As a graduate teaching fellow, Schiff taught at Hunter College, the College of Staten Island, and Nassau Community College. She spent several years working for the auction house Phillips, de Pury and Luxembourg in New York as assistant to the CEO and as manager of international operations. Before she launched SFA in 2002 she directed Edward Tyler Nahem Fine Art gallery in New York. Schiff also launched SFA offices in Los Angeles and London. She regularly consults and fundraises for the LDF and curated several charity auctions for the foundation in Saint Tropez.

She is also founder and head of the LDF's Art & The Environment series, which presented Andrea Bowers and Tomas Sanchez at Pérez Art Museum Miami (PAMM), Porky Hefer at Design Miami and John Gerrard’s Solar Reserve at Los Angeles County Museum of Art (LACMA).

In 2013 Schiff co-founded the VIA (Visionary Initiatives in Art) Art Fund, which supports individual artists, curators, and small to mid-sized nonprofit organizations that work in the contemporary arts space.

In December 2017 the launch of her company One All Every was announced, which produces artist environmental protest billboards.

Schiff has curated numerous exhibitions including Open Source: Art at the Eclipse of Capitalism. Around this exhibition a panel discussion, featuring a key note speech from economic theorist Jeremy Rifkin, was hosted at the Palais de Tokyo in Paris.

As an expert on art Schiff has been quoted by the New York Times, the Financial Times, Bloomberg, the Guardian and CNN. In addition, she lectures and sits on panels such as discussions on the relationship between art and environmentalism at Design Miami 2017 and Basel 2018. Her lecturing experiences include the Courtauld Institute in London, Institute of Contemporary Arts in London, the Art & Business Conference in New York, and Talking Galleries in Barcelona among others.

Position on art advisory 
"My main job is to make the art world transparent, to help empower collectors. It’s such a complex world and very opaque. If you’re in it every day, it becomes second nature . . . When people come in, they often leave quickly because they feel threatened, make mistakes, or they’re taken advantage of. So I’m trying to help people understand . . . and enjoy it.”

Family 
Schiff has a son, who is of half-Danish descent.

Affiliations 

 on the Artemis Council of the New Museum in New York
 on the Board of Trustees of the Swiss Institute Contemporary Art New York
 founding board member of LA><ART in Los Angeles
 co-founded VIA Art Fund
 on the Board of Trustees of the Bronx Museum of Art
 Rhizome Council
 Publishers Circle of Triple Canopy
on the DIA Council of Art

Publications 

 2003: Informed Consent: Information Production and Ideology, Scarecrow Press,

References 

Living people
American art curators
American women curators
1969 births
University of Michigan College of Literature, Science, and the Arts alumni
University of Miami alumni
21st-century American women